Monolith is the sixth studio album by American progressive rock band Kansas, released in 1979 (see 1979 in music). The album reached No. 10 on the Billboard album charts, marking their third straight (and last) studio album to reach the top ten.

Overview 
Their first studio album to be produced by the band themselves, Monolith would be the third studio album release by Kansas to rank in the Top Ten of the Billboard album chart'. However Monolith would prove to be a commercial disappointment in the face of bad reviews - see Section 3 - and the lack of a high impact hit single, the lead single "People of the South Wind" stalling in the Top 30 of the Billboard Hot 100 in August 1979 causing the rush release of "Reason to Be" as the second single: much-likened to Kansas' signature hit "Dust in the Wind", "Reason to Be" would nowhere near approximate that 1978 Top Ten hit's success, the Hot 100 peak of "Reason to Be" being #52.

On their 80-city US tour, the band's set list featured the entire album early in the tour, though by the time the tour ended, about half the songs had been cut from the live set in favor of older numbers. A national broadcast of their show at Alpine Valley, Wisconsin on this tour featured the entire album and is one of the most popular unissued live recordings of the band. Believing that fans didn't like Monolith, they did not perform any of the songs again until the mid-1990s, when they revived "People of the South Wind" and "Reason to Be" briefly. This century, the opening track, "On the Other Side", has been featured in performances on and off on tours, including that for the Device – Voice – Drum DVD, although not appearing on the DVD itself.  With the arrival of a revamped lineup over the past 5 years, songs such as "Reason to Be" and "People of the South Wind" have been added to the setlist at various times.

Following the US Monolith tour, the band had its first tour of Japan, in January 1980. The band performed four songs from Monolith on their Japanese tour: "People of the South Wind," "Stay Out of Trouble," "How My Soul Cries Out for You" (the set closer featuring a dramatic performance including a body dropping from the ceiling), and "On the Other Side" (which was released as an edited picture sleeve single in Japan). A special promotional album entitled Kansas Monolith Tour 1980 in Japan was issued to radio stations there to publicize the dates and featured three songs from Monolith and five of their earlier popular songs (2 studio versions, and 3 live versions).

Monolith initially sold about 800,000 copies, obtaining gold status, but ultimately went platinum in the early 1990s. Kerry Livgren donated his platinum record to the Kansas State Historical Society.  The album stayed on the Billboard album chart for a total of 24 weeks, and was one of the Top 100 charting albums (#100) for the calendar year 1979.  

Even though MTV was still two years away, promotional music videos were produced for four tracks on Monolith: "On the Other Side", "People of the South Wind", "Away from You", and "Reason to Be".

Livgren's lyrics on Monolith were partly influenced by The Urantia Book, of which he was a devotee before his conversion to Christianity.

Cover art 
As Phil Ehart, drummer for the band Kansas, shared with Jeb Wright (a legendary rock radio and print interviewer) in a Goldmine interview called "behind the paintbrush", Ehart told stories about the artwork for Kansas album covers and this is what he said about the Monolith album cover...

Bruce Wolfe, an artist that did a Levi’s commercial, did that album cover. He had done one of the first animated commercials on television. By the time CBS approached him, he had been doing some album covers. We had sent him the song “People of the South Wind” and he sent back this fricking painting … it was huge. It was not a drawing; it was a real painting of this Indian whose headdress was a space helmet. There were all of these overpasses that were broken and there were a bunch of Indians on the back that looked like they were at a Boy Scout camp or something. He did an incredible job. He took our logo and made it work. It was always a challenge to take that logo and make it look cool. He used the features on it and it really worked. Again, what an icon … it was a 9-foot-tall Native American chief wearing some sort of buffalo robe and a space helmet with horns. The guy must have done a lot of drugs, but we thought it was really cool.

Release history
The album was remastered and reissued in 2011, as a Japanese import vinyl-replica Blu-spec CD (Epic EICP 20078) including the rarity live version of "On the Other Side" previously available only on the 1994 Legacy-issued Box Set.  A domestic version of the remaster was released in standard CD format in the US as part of Legacy Recordings' Classic Album Collection series which included all of their Kirshner/CBS studio releases.  A Dutch-issued "Music on CD" series released the album on CD in 2016.  It was last of the albums with the original lineup to be re-released on vinyl.  Three different colored vinyl versions appeared in 2018 and 2019.

Reception 

The album received negative reviews. John Swenson of Rolling Stone, who had previously reviewed Point of Know Return, was far less pleased with Monolith, particularly criticizing the album's pretentiousness ("this band is just an American version of the Moody Blues and Emerson, Lake and Palmer: "serious" music that turns up its nose at rock & roll's expressiveness and substitutes bombast for emotion.") and the awkward hemming and hawing lyrics (citing "And if I seem too inconclusive/It's just because it's so elusive" as an example).

Steve Bond in the LA Times opined that while Kansas had fulfilled its inaugural promise as heir apparent to progrock veterans Yes and Emerson Lake & Palmer with their 1977 breakout hit "Carry On Wayward Son", Monolith would indicate that "success [has] bred complacency", the album lacking the "variety and spice" of the band's precedent output: "[although Kansas'] six members are all solid musicians who can dish out reasonably inventive, attractively textured rock & roll [they] apparently can't resist the temptation to recreate the overblown, showy instrumentals and ponderously empty lyrics symptomatic of those [progrock veterans] at their worst."

Robert Taylor of AllMusic retrospectively awarded the album two stars out of five, commending the band's fine playing while criticizing an exhaustion of their musical style and an overall lack of direction. He particularly criticized the "juvenile" lyrics and a shifting focus towards mainstream radio.

Record World said of the single "Reason to Be" that "Dramatic vocals and extravagantly produced instrumental colors make a moving statement."

Track listing

Personnel 
Kansas
 Steve Walsh – keyboards, lead and backing vocals
 Kerry Livgren – guitars, keyboards
 Rich Williams – guitars
 Robby Steinhardt – violin, backing vocals, lead vocals on "Angels Have Fallen," "How My Soul Cries Out for You," and "Stay Out of Trouble," anvil
 Dave Hope – bass
 Phil Ehart – drums

Additional musicians
The O. K. Chorale – background vocals on "Angels Have Fallen"

Production
 Kansas – producer, cover concept
Brad Aaron, Davey Moiré – engineers, mixing at Capricorn Studios, Macon, Georgia  
Les Horn, Steve Tillisch, David Pinkston – assistant engineers
Tom Drennon – art direction and design
Bruce Wolfe – illustration
Neal Preston – photography

Charts 
 

Album

Singles

Certifications

References 

Kansas (band) albums
1979 albums
Epic Records albums